Sir Samuel Isidore Salmon, CBE, JP (18 October 1900 – 10 November 1980) was a British politician, corporate executive, and philanthropist.

Early life
Salmon was born in Kensington, London, the son of Isidore Salmon MP and Kate Abrahams. He attended Bedales School, for which he was head boy in 1919.

Career
Salmon served on London County Council, representing Cities of London and Westminster, from 1949 until its abolition in 1965.  From 1965 to 1968, he was a member of the Greater London Council, for which he became Deputy Chairman in 1968. He was Mayor of Hammersmith in 1968–69, and from 1965 to 1968 was chairman of J. Lyons and Co.

Personal life
Salmon married Lallah Wendy Benjamin; they had two children: Belinda Harding and Jonathan Salmon.

References

External links
 Time Magazine: Britain From Tea to Tease, retrieved 22 Feb 2011.

1900 births
1980 deaths
People from Kensington
Jewish British politicians
Knights Bachelor
Members of London County Council
Members of the Greater London Council
English chief executives
Mayors of places in Greater London
Councillors in the London Borough of Hammersmith and Fulham
People educated at Bedales School
Gluckstein family
Samuel Isidore
20th-century English businesspeople